Henrik Strindberg (born 28 March 1954) is a Swedish composer of contemporary music. He studied composition at the Royal College of Music in Stockholm from 1980 to 1987 where he studied for Gunnar Bucht and Sven-David Sandström amongst others. In 1985 he also participated in a summer course with Iannis Xenakis in Delphi. Apart from composing, he has been a member of the progressive rock band Ragnarök since the 1970s. His music has been performed by acclaimed ensembles such as Swedish Radio Symphony Orchestra, Kroumata, Sonanza and The Gothenburg Combo.

Partial list of works
 Bambu (1984)
 Modell (1984)
 Hjärtats slag (Heart Beats) (1985)
 Inse  (1985)
 Unngg (1985)
 Tredje andningen (Third Wind) (1985–1986)
 I träd (Within Trees) (1986–1988)
 Det första kvädet om Gudrun (1987)
 Cassant (1989)
 Fyra stycken (Four Pieces) (1990)
 Etymology  (1990–1992)
 Katsu (1991)
 2 Pianos  (1992)
 Cheap Thrills (1993)
 Nattlig madonna (Nocturnal Madonna) (1993)
 Ursprung/gläntor (Origins/Glades) (1993)
 Näcken epilog (1994–2002)
 Förstorade fragment av en melodi (Magnified Fragments of a Melody) (1995–1996)
 Vandringsflöjten (The Wandering Flute) (1996)
 Hopp (Hope)  (1997)
 Minne (Memorial) (1997)
 Utvald (Chosen) (1998)
 Lika (Equal) (1998–1999)
 En mans väg hos en ung kvinna (2000)
 Trådar (Threads) (2001)
 ...knäpper och drar (2002)
 Lågmälda göranden (Understated Activities) (2003)
 This road to Baghdad (2003)
 I thought someone came (2003–2004)
 Puff (2004)
 Bryta snitt. Tiden fryser  (2005)
 Zum-zum-zum (2006)
 Neptuni åkrar (2006)

References

External links
Henrik Strindberg's Homepage

1954 births
Contemporary classical music in Sweden
Living people
Swedish classical composers
Swedish male classical composers
Henrik